West Virginia Wesleyan College is a private college in Buckhannon, West Virginia. It has an enrollment of about 1,400 students from 35 U.S. states and 26 countries. The school was founded in 1890 by the West Virginia Conference of the Methodist Episcopal Church and is currently affiliated with the United Methodist Church. West Virginia Wesleyan College is accredited by the Higher Learning Commission.

History

Early history 
West Virginia Wesleyan College was founded in 1890 by the West Virginia Annual Conference of the Methodist Episcopal Church.  The school opened on September 3, 1890, in a new three-story brick building that was where the current Lynch-Raine Administration Building now stands. Ohio Wesleyan University and Boston University School of Theology alumnus Bennett W. Hutchinson was the college's first president.

Following ten years focusing on college preparatory work, college-level instruction was first offered in 1900 culminating in the first baccalaureate degrees in 1905. For one year the institution was named Wesleyan University of West Virginia but it was quickly changed to West Virginia Wesleyan College in honor of John Wesley, the founder of Methodism. Pre-college instruction continued until 1923 when it was discontinued because the high schools in the state had grown enough to adequately perform that task.

Recent years 
Dr. Pamela Jubin Balch, a 1971 graduate of Wesleyan, became the college's 18th president in July 2006. Dr. Balch is the first woman to serve as president in the college's history. At the outset of her tenure as President, Balch reinstated the college's briefly-discontinued nursing program as well as its 3-2 engineering program. The college has since expanded its academic programs, adding graduate degrees in athletic training, business administration, English Writing, and nursing.

In 2009 Wesleyan opened the $7.2 million Virginia Thomas Law Center for the Performing Arts followed shortly thereafter by the $8.9 million David E. Reemsnyder Research Center in 2010. A series of residential improvements to the campus were realized in the construction of a new 140-bed residence hall on Camden Avenue as well as a comprehensive renovation and restructuring of Fleming Hall, the college's second oldest permanent residence hall after Agnes Howard Hall.  Adding to its already-beautiful and decidedly park-like campus, Wesleyan developed a sprawling green space in front of Wesley Chapel and included a fountain that had long been envisioned for the space since President Stanley Martin's campus master plan of the mid-1960s.  Recent academic restructuring has contributed to the academic success of the college, with individual departments now consolidated into seven schools: Arts and Humanities, Athletic Training and Exercise Science, Business, Education, Nursing, Science, and Social Sciences. The College has seen consistent enrollment growth, with the number of students growing from 1,150 in 2006 to around 1,400 at present.

Wesleyan students have also enjoyed national success. During the Balch presidency, nine Wesleyan students have been awarded Fulbright Scholarships and one student became the first student from any West Virginia college or university student to become a Mitchell Scholar. Wesleyan's Students in Free Enterprise team has finished among the top 40 in the nation the past two years and Wesleyan ranks fifth among all NCAA Division II colleges and universities in the number of Academic Achievement Award winners.  Wesleyan students have also been named NCAA Post-Graduate Scholarship winners each of the last two years. Over 300 science majors have participated in federal and state-funded scientific research projects during the past five years.

Academics
The college offers over 50 undergraduate majors and 33 minors.  Wesleyan also has 3-2 engineering partnerships with Marshall University and West Virginia University. Undergraduate degrees are awarded in Bachelor of Arts, Bachelor of Science, Bachelor of Science in Nursing, and Bachelor of Music Education. Graduate degrees awarded include the Master of Science in Athletic Training, Master of Business Administration, Master of Fine Arts in Creative Writing, and Master of Science in Nursing.

Approximately 80% of West Virginia Wesleyan's faculty have earned doctorates or comparable terminal degrees within their field. The student-faculty ratio is 14 to 1, with an average class size of 19.

Campus

The campus boasts 23 major buildings of Georgian architecture, a legacy of the presidency of Stanley H. Martin (1957–1972). The grounds are situated in a park-like setting of more than 100 acres. The campus also hosts a variety of local flora, such as white oak and spruce trees, dogwoods, laurels, and rhododendrons. Some of the recognizable buildings on campus are the Lynch-Raine Administration building, Annie Merner Pfeiffer Library, Reemsnyder Research Center, and Wesley Chapel, which is the highest capacity chapel in West Virginia.

Student life
Wesleyan has retained its residential character; about 90% of the students live on campus, due to its inclusive campus housing policies.

There are 21 NCAA Division II sports teams, and 70 clubs and organizations.

The college's athletics teams are the Bobcats, which compete in the NCAA Division II Mountain East Conference, of which it was a founding member in 2013. The Bobcats were former members of the West Virginia Intercollegiate Athletic Conference (WVIAC), having been recognized as having the top athletic program in the WVIAC.by winning, over 151 conference championships and earning a conference dominance of 18 Commissioner's Cups during the past 20 years and eight Presidents' Cups in 14 years. Each year, Wesleyan's 21 NCAA II teams successfully compete at the regional and national levels.  Wesleyan also ranks fifth among all NCAA II schools in the number of Academic Achievement Award winners.

The Greek system was initiated on campus in 1925, when the Board of Trustees authorized the establishment of two sororities and three fraternities. The four Panhellenic-affiliated sororities are Alpha Gamma Delta, Alpha Delta Pi, Alpha Xi Delta, and Zeta Tau Alpha. The five Interfraternity Council-affiliated fraternities are Alpha Sigma Phi, Chi Phi, the Kappa Alpha Order, Theta Chi, and Theta Xi. There are also many additional organizational brotherhoods, sisterhoods, and honorary groups on campus including Alpha Phi Omega, Alpha Psi Omega, Beta Beta Beta, Kappa Phi, Mortar Board, Omicron Delta Kappa, Phi Alpha Theta, Phi Mu Alpha Sinfonia, Sigma Alpha Iota, Sigma Tau Epsilon, Sigma Tau Delta, and Sigma Theta Epsilon.

Wesleyan students are highly active in community engagement projects. Some 87% of students participate in community service through the Center for Community Engagement and Leadership Development (CCE). The CCE has been recognized on both a state and national level for its community service endeavors. Students in the CCE also organized the first collegiate Jump Rope for Heart events in the United States.

Wesleyan traditions

Athletics

Many features of modern campus life at Wesleyan have long traditions. The college currently boasts 21 sports, competing in NCAA Division II. The college offers varsity men's sports in baseball, basketball, cross country, football, golf, soccer, swimming, tennis, indoor track and field and outdoor track and field. The college offers varsity women's sports in basketball, cross country, golf, lacrosse, soccer, softball, swimming, tennis, indoor track and field, outdoor track and field and volleyball. The 21st varsity sport, women's lacrosse, formally began competition in the fall of 2010.

Wesleyan was a member of the West Virginia Intercollegiate Athletic Conference (WVIAC). The WVIAC disbanded after the 2012-13 season and the school joined the new Mountain East Conference.

Wesley Chapel 
An important legacy of the college is Wesley Chapel. With the ability to seat 1,800 people, Wesley Chapel annually hosts the West Virginia United Methodist Annual Conference each June. The "Conference Sunday" service, the culmination of the Conference, always fills Wesley Chapel to standing-room-only.

Wesley Chapel also provides a fantastic venue for the Arts. Several campus musical groups perform in the Chapel each semester, as well as artists who visit WVWC as a part of its annual "Arts Alive" Program. Many world-renowned artists have performed in Wesley Chapel over the years including a memorable performance by Maynard Ferguson, who famously performed a trumpet solo from the pulpit.

Written histories
Haught, Thomas W., West Virginia Wesleyan College 1890-1940, Buckhannon, WV: West Virginia Wesleyan College Press, 1940.
McCuskey, Roy, All Things Work Together for Good to them that Love God, Buckhannon, WV: West Virginia Wesleyan College Press, ca. 1950.
Miller, Brett T., Our Home Among the Hills: West Virginia Wesleyan's First 125 Years, Virginia Beach, VA: The Donning Company Publishers, 2014.
Plummer, Kenneth M., A History of West Virginia Wesleyan College, 1890-1965, Buckhannon, WV: West Virginia Wesleyan College Press, 1965.

Notable alumni
Maggie Anderson (born 1948), poet
Ken Ash (1901–1979), baseball player
Chalmers Ault (1900–1979), American football player
William E. Baker (1873–1954), judge
Pamela Balch, academic; 18th president of West Virginia Wesleyan College
Len Barnum (1912–1998), American football player
Cliff Battles (1910–1981), American football player
Thomas Bickerton (born 1958), bishop
Sheriff Blake (1899–1982), baseball player
Shannon Breen (born 1989), American football player
Jim Brogan (born 1958), basketball player
Lewis C. Cantley (born 1949), cell biologist
Ted Cassidy (1932–1979), actor
Robin Davis (born 1956), jurist
Ray Dorr (1941–2001), American football player
William Flanagan (1901–1975), American football player
Matt Foreman, activist
Denise Giardina (born 1951), novelist
L. J. Hanifan (1879–1932), economist
John Kellison (1886–1971), American football player
Jason Koon (born 1985), poker player
Oscar Lambert (1890–1970), athlete
Jean Lee Latham (1902–1995), writer
Blanche Lazzell (1878–1956), painter
John F. McCuskey (born 1947), justice of the Supreme Court of Appeals of West Virginia
Irene McKinney (1939–2012), poet
Jim Miller (1908–1965), American football player
Scott Douglas Miller, President of Virginia Wesleyan University, former president of Bethany College, Wesley College, and Lincoln Memorial University
Greasy Neale (1891–1973), American football player
Daniel Pitt O'Brien (1900–1957), politician
Okey L. Patteson (1898–1989), politician
Anthony Peters (born 1983), American soccer player
Nelson Peterson (1913–1990), American football player
Edward G. Rohrbough (1874–1956), politician
Harry Shriver (1896–1970), baseball player
Stephen Skinner, politician
Margaret Smith (born 1952), politician
David E. Stuart, anthropologist
Chalmers Tschappat (1896–1958), American football player
Peter D. Weaver (born 1945), bishop
Lillian Mayfield Wright (1894–1986), poet
Bil Lepp, Storyteller and History Channel TV Host

References

External links
Official website

 
Private universities and colleges in West Virginia
Education in Upshur County, West Virginia
Educational institutions established in 1890
Methodism in West Virginia
Buildings and structures in Upshur County, West Virginia
1890 establishments in West Virginia